Morris B. Payne (1885-1961) was an American architect from New London, Connecticut. He was also major general in the Connecticut National Guard and commanded 43rd Infantry Division at the beginning of World War II.

Life and career
Morris Benham Payne was born in Waterford, Connecticut, on January 19, 1885. He attended the public schools. Wishing to become a civil engineer, he entered the offices of Daball & Crandall, a New London engineering firm. from 1906 to 1912 he was employed by the United States engineering department. When he left government work in 1912, he established a partnership with architect James S. Duffy as Duffy & Payne, architects and engineers. They went separate ways in 1913, and Payne worked alone for the next two years.

In late 1915, he established a partnership with B. Bouis Adams, an architect from Washington, DC. Payne went abroad to France in 1917 with the Coast Artillery Corps, at which point Adams managed the office alone. Due to his declining health in Payne's absence, he closed the office in late 1918, and died in February 1919. Payne returned in January of that year, and after Adams' death, established a new partnership, Payne & Griswold, with Harry Todd Griswold. Edward R. Keefe joined the partnership in 1920, which became Payne, Griswold & Keefe. Griswold withdrew in 1922, after which point the firm existed as Payne & Keefe. Payne & Keefe existed at least through the early 1950s.

Military career
Payne enlisted in the Connecticut National Guard in 1902 and was commissioned as a second lieutenant in the Coast Artillery Corps in 1906.   He was promoted to major in 1912 and was mobilized for service on the Mexican border in 1916.  He was remobilized in 1917 and served on active duty during World War I.  After the war, he was promoted to colonel in 1921 and brigadier general in 1923 when he was appointed Quartermaster General of the Connecticut National Guard.

On July 18, 1927, he was promoted to major general and placed in command of the 43rd Division.  In February 1941 the division was mobilized and Payne served as its commander until he was relieved of command in August of that year.  Payne's relief was, apparently, not due to any misconduct on his part but because of an Army policy to replace National Guard division commanders with Regular Army officers.

Death and burial
Payne died on January 31, 1961, and was buried in Arlington National Cemetery.

He was an active Freemason.

Legacy
One of Payne's buildings, the U. S. Post Office in New London, has been listed on the National Register of Historic Places. In addition, many of his works in New London, Old Lyme, and Groton contribute to listed historic districts.

In a 1921 publication detailing Connecticut domestic architecture, the work of Payne's firm was described as "...in the style so highly esteemed by the Founders. The people here seem to revere the architectural traditions of their old homes, but it appears to be a reverence thoroughly intermixed with discriminatory appreciation which counts for a clientele that stimulates because of its intelligent enthusiasm".

Architectural works

Payne & Adams, 1915-1918

Payne & Griswold, 1919-1920

Payne, Griswold & Keefe, 1920-1922

Payne & Keefe, from 1922

References

External links
Generals of World War II

1885 births
1961 deaths
Architects from Connecticut
People from New London, Connecticut
American Freemasons
United States Army generals
United States Army personnel of World War I
United States Army generals of World War II
Military personnel from Connecticut
United States Army Coast Artillery Corps personnel